Rosalind Cecilia Cavaliero (born 27 November 1967) is a Brazilian-born English actress. She has appeared in numerous television roles.

Filmography
{| class="wikitable sortable"
|-
! Year
! Title
! Role
! class="unsortable" | Notes
|-
| 1995
| Medics
| Penny Milner 
|
|-
| 1996
| Kiss and Tell
| Maggie Wallace
|
|-
| 1996–1999
| Big Bag
| Molly 
|
|-
| 1998
| Where the Heart Is 
|
|
|-
| rowspan="2"| 1999
| Topsy-Turvy
| Miss Moore 
|
|-
| Cold Feet 
| Amy 
| Series 2 regular
|-
| rowspan="2"| 2000
| Best of Both Worlds
| Francesca
|
|-
| The Secret World of Michael Fry
| Janine
|
|-
| rowspan="2"| 2001
| The Bill
| Jackie Carter 
| Episode: "Suffer the little children" 
|-
|Red Cap 
| Maddie Rose 
|
|-
| rowspan="2"| 2002
| French and Saunders
|
| Christmas Special 
|-
| Midsomer Murders
|
|
|-
|
| Heartbeat
| Sandra
| Series 12, episode 1
|-
| 2003
| Eyes Down
| Christine McMurray 
|
|-
| rowspan="2"| 2004
| Things to Do Before You're 30
| Rosie
|
|-
|Vera Drake
| Married Woman 
|
|-
| 2004, 2005
| Green Wing
| Teacher, Voice Coach 
|
|-
| rowspan="3| 2005
| The Catherine Tate Show 
| Arthur
| Christmas Special
|-
| Peep Show 
| Vicky
|
|-
| Spoons 
|
|
|-
| 2006
| Feel the Force| Sally Frank 
|
|-
| 2006–2009
| Jam and Jerusalem| Kate Bales 
|
|-
| 2007
| Saxondale| Penny 
|
|-
| 2008
| Little Dorrit| Mrs Plornish
|
|-
| rowspan="2"| 2009
| Nativity! 
| Miss Rye 
|
|-
| Bellamy's People 
| Various characters 
|
|-
| 2010
| Lark Rise to Candleford 
|
|
|-
| 2010–2016
| Mid Morning Matters with Alan Partridge| Rosie Witter 
|
|-
| rowspan="4"| 2011
| Spy| Paula
|
|-
| Jane Eyre 
| Grace Poole 
|
|-
| Shameless 
| Jenny Taylor 
|
|-
| The Crimson Petal and the White 
| Jennifer Pierce 
|
|-
| rowspan="2"| 2012
| Full English 
| Wendy 
|
|-
| Hunderby 
| Hesther 
|
|-
| rowspan="2"| 2013
| Pat & Cabbage 
|
|
|-
| A Young Doctor's notebook| Pelagaya 
|
|-
| rowspan="3"| 2014
| Lewis 
| Karen Newman 
| Episode: "The Lions of Nemea"
|-
| Inside No.9 
| Kirstie 
|
|-
| The Job Lot|
|
|-
| 2014, 2015
| Prey 
| DS/DCI Susan Reinhart 
|
|-
| rowspan="7"| 2015
| Doc Martin 
| Melanie 
|
|-
| Professor Branestawm Returns 
| Mary Oxford 
|
|-
| An Evening with Harry Enfield & Paul Whitehouse 
| Various characters
|
|-
| Nurse 
| April the Cat Lady
|
|-
| The Enfield Haunting 
| Peggy Hodgson 
|
|-
| Midsomer Murders 
| Judy Tyler
| Series 17 Episode 4, "A Vintage Murder" 
|-
| Death in Paradise 
| Ivy Marcel 
| Series 4 Episode 4
|-
| rowspan="2"| 2017
| The Children Act 
| Marina Green 
|
|-
| Unforgotten 
| Marion Kelsey
|
|-
| 2018
| Friday Night Dinner 
| The Other Jackie 
|
|-
| 2018–2019
| Hold the Sunset 
| Wendy
|
|-
| rowspan="2"| 2019
| Gentleman Jack 
| Elizabeth Cordingley 
|
|-
| Worzel Gummidge 
| Mrs Braithwaite 
|
|-
| rowspan="2"| 2020
| Code 404 
| DCS Dennett 
|
|-
| [[Black Narcissus (miniseries)|Black Narcissus]] 
| Sister Briony 
|
|-

|}

Theatre work 
 Dracula at the Everyman, Cheltenham – Florrie (February 1995)
 Airswimming at the Battersea Arts Centre, London – Persephone (February 1997)
 In Flame at the Bush Theatre, London (January 1999), then transferring to the New Ambassadors Theatre, London (September 2000) – Clara
 Abigail's Party at the Hampstead Theatre (July 2002), then transferring to the New Ambassadors Theatre, London (December 2002) – Angela
 The Anniversary at the Liverpool Playhouse (September 2004) and then transferring to the Garrick Theatre, London (January 2005) – Karen

Radio work 
 The Public BBC Radio 3 (November 1999)
 The Bayeux Tapestry BBC Radio 4 (19 February 2001)
 Doctor Joe Aston Investigates BBC Radio 4 (7 December 2001)
 Beyond the Back of Beyond BBC Radio 4 (26 December 2001)
 Just Plain Gardening BBC Radio 4 (March 2002)
 The Don BBC Radio 3 (September 2004)
 Cashcows BBC Radio 4 (2005)
 The Spaceship – Karen Trex (2005–2008)
 Nebulous – Paula Breeze (2005–2006)
 Project: Lazarus (A Doctor Who audio drama) – Cassie
 Project:Twilight (A Doctor Who audio drama) – Cassie
 Self Storage BBC Radio 4 – Judy (October 2007)
 Laura Solon: Talking and Not Talking BBC Radio 4 – various (June 2008)
 One Chord Wonders: Parallel Lines BBC Radio 4 (11 July 2008)
 Lost Property BBC Radio 4 – Afternoon Play (17 May 2011) – Drama in three episodes. Narrator and, in episode 3, Ruthie
 Cabin Pressure by John Finnemore
 Where This Service Will... BBC Radio 4 – Afternoon Play (2016 thru till 2020) – five episodes by Katherine Jakeways
 Inappropriate Relationships BBC Radio 4 – Drama in five episodes (February–March 2017)
 Broken English BBC Radio 4 – Drama in ten episodes (September–October 2020) – by Shelagh Stephenson

Awards
The Radio 4 trilogy Lost Property won the '2011 BBC Audio Drama Award' for Best Drama, and Rosie Cavaliero won the Best Actress award for her role as 'Ruthie' in episode 3 Lost Property – A Telegram from the Queen.

References

External links 
 

Living people
1967 births
20th-century English actresses
21st-century English actresses
Actresses from Rio de Janeiro (city)
Alumni of the Webber Douglas Academy of Dramatic Art
Brazilian emigrants to England
British actors of Latin American descent
English radio actresses
English stage actresses
English television actresses